NL may stand for:

Businesses and organizations
 National League, one of two leagues in Major League Baseball
 Shaheen Air (IATA airline designator: NL)

Computing
 .nl, the Internet country code top-level domain for the Netherlands
 NL (complexity), a computational complexity class
 nl (format), a file format for presenting mathematical programming problems
 nl (Unix), a Unix utility for numbering lines
 Newline, a special character in computing signifying the end of a line of text

Places
 Nagaland, a state of India
 Netherlands (ISO 3166-1 alpha-2 country code: NL)
 Newfoundland and Labrador, a Canadian province
 North Lanarkshire, a council area of Scotland
 Nuevo León, a northeastern Mexican state

Other uses
 Dutch language (ISO 639-2 alpha-2 language code: nl)
 No liability, an Australian form of limited liability company

See also

 nI (disambiguation)
 n1 (disambiguation)